= Coldstream Stone =

Prehistoric artefact

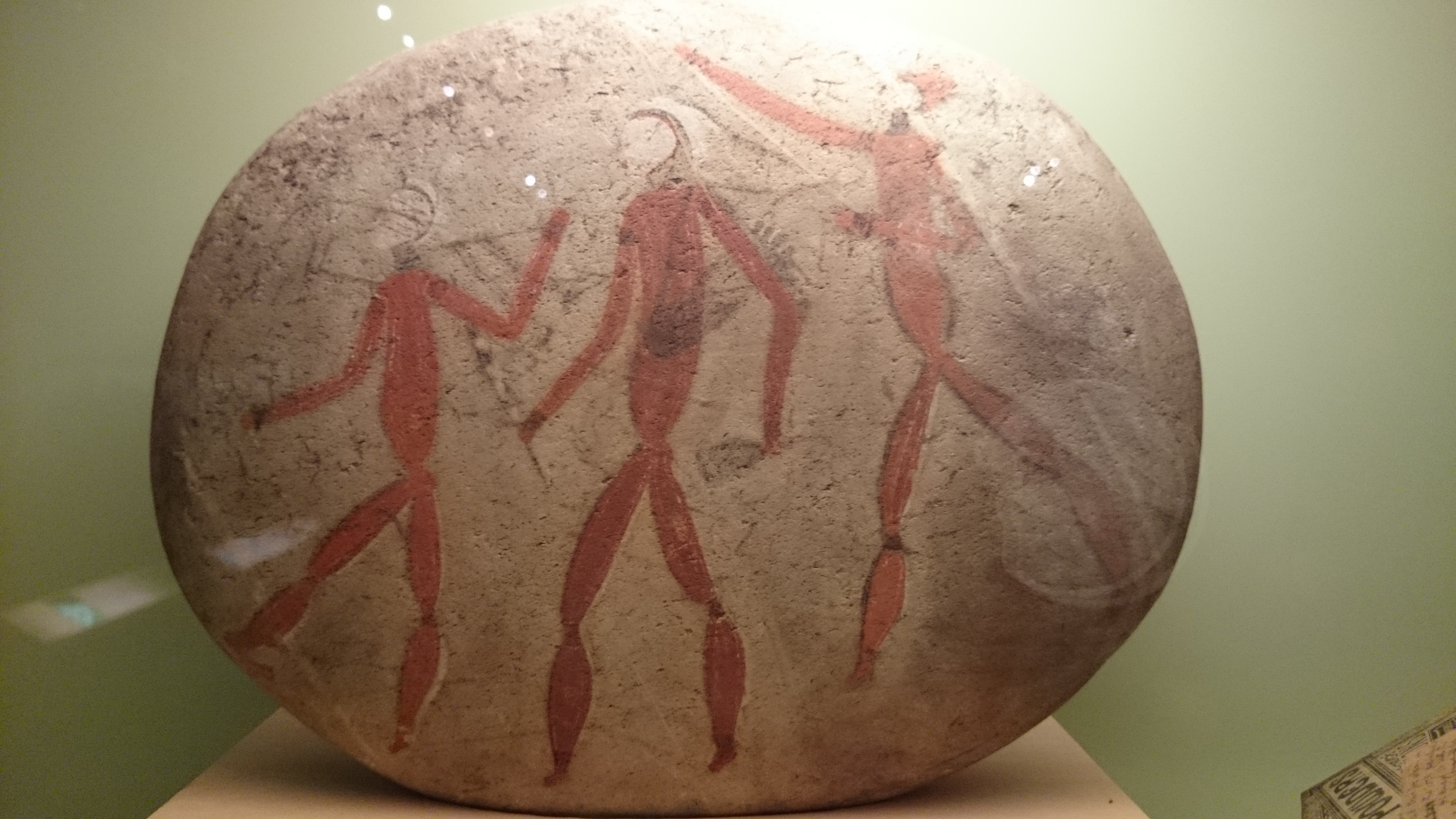
The Coldstream Stone

The Coldstream Stone is a small polychrome, painted stone that was found buried with a human skeleton in a rock shelter near the Lottering River in the southern coast of the Western Cape Province in South Africa.
